Another Kind of Blues is the first studio album released by English punk band, the U.K. Subs. It was released in the UK on 14 September 1979 on GEM Records, a subsidiary of RCA. It is considered a classic from the punk era.
Produced at Kingsway Studio by John McCoy.

The style of music borrows heavily from blues and rock'n'roll but infused much of the energy and social commentary that was shaping the wider punk rock scene.

Critics were divided on the album's merits. Writing for the New Musical Express, Charles Shaar Murray described the album as being "As appetising as the tea-bag left to dry on the saucer" 
 
, while in Sounds, Garry Bushell awarded the album five stars and called it "a near perfect slice of good time high energy punk."

The first 20,000 copies were printed on blue vinyl and the album reached number 21 in the UK album charts.

The U.K. Subs have released 26 official albums, each beginning with a different letter of the alphabet. Their most recent, Ziezo, was released in 2016.

Track listing
All songs written by Nicky Garratt and Charlie Harper, except where noted.

Personnel
UK Subs
Charlie Harper – lead vocals, harmonica
Nicky Garratt – guitar, backing vocals
Paul Slack – bass
Pete Davies – drums

Additional personnel
Bob Broglia – engineer
Paul "Chas" Watkins and Bob Broglia – mixing engineers
Hothouse – sleeve
Paul Canty, Yuka Fujii and Tony MacLean – photography

References

1979 debut albums
U.K. Subs albums
RCA Records albums